Peskovatka is a rural locality (a selo) in Yudanovskoye Rural Settlement, Bobrovsky District, Voronezh Oblast, Russia. The population was 448 as of 2010. There are 6 streets.

Geography 
Peskovatka is located 24 km north of Bobrov (the district's administrative centre) by road. Yudanovka is the nearest rural locality.

References 

Rural localities in Bobrovsky District